The 2000 Hong Kong Sevens was an international rugby sevens tournament that was part of the inaugural World Sevens Series, the 1999–2000 season. It was the eighth leg of the series, held on 24–26 March 2000, at the Hong Kong Stadium, Hong Kong.

The tournament was the first edition of the Hong Kong Sevens within the World Sevens Series and contained 24 teams, an increase of eight from the other tournaments held in the Series. It was won by New Zealand who defeated Fiji 31–5 in the Cup final to win their fourth title of the Series.

Teams
The 24 participating teams were:

 Arabian Gulf

Format
With the increased number of teams competing, the teams were drawn into six pools of four teams each. Each team played the other teams in their pool once, with 3 points awarded for a win, 2 points for a draw, and 1 point for a loss (no points awarded for a forfeit). The pool stage was played over the first two days of the tournament. The top team from each pool along with the two best runners-up advanced to the Cup quarter finals. The remaining four runners-up along with the four best third-placed teams advanced to the Plate quarter finals. The remaining eight teams went on to the Bowl quarter finals. No Shield trophy was on offer in the 1999-2000 season.

Pool stage

Pool A

Source World Rugby

Source World Rugby

Pool B

Source World Rugby

Source World Rugby

Pool C

Source World Rugby

Source World Rugby

Pool D

Source World Rugby

Source World Rugby

Pool E

Source World Rugby

Source World Rugby

Pool F

Source World Rugby

Source World Rugby

Knockout stage

Play on the third day of the tournament consisted of finals matches for the Bowl, Plate, and Cup competitions. The following is a list of the recorded results.

Bowl

Source: World Rugby

Plate

Source: World Rugby

Cup

Source: World Rugby

Tournament placings

Source: Rugby7.com

Series standings
At the completion of Round 8:

Source: Rugby7.com

 South Africa reached the semifinal stage of the Brisbane Sevens but was stripped of all points for the tournament due to fielding ineligible players.

References

2000
rugby union
1999–2000 IRB Sevens World Series
2000 in Asian rugby union